Abraham Titsingh (1684 – September 1776) was a Dutch surgeon who, although poorly trained, attempted to reform the system of medicine in the Netherlands through changes in the guild of surgeons clashing with several figures of the time including Jacobus Denys.

Titsingh was born in Amsterdam. His mother came from the Grebber family. His father, was a navy surgeon who was killed in 1691 while fighting the French at sea and he only received primary education before becoming a surgeon's apprentice at the age of eleven. Like his father, he too joined the navy as a second ship surgeon in 1702. In 1710 he returned to Amsterdam and after passing an examination received license to practice in 1711. He found the surgeon's guild to be corrupt and wrote a book on the abuses in 1730. He headed the guild from September 1731 and attempted to improve the system. He published several books, including on medical treatment in maritime voyages.

References 

Dutch surgeons
1684 births
1776 deaths